Matthew Nwozaku Chukwudi Blaise is a Nigerian queer rights activist.

Activity 
In March 2020, after the murder of a gay man in Nigeria, Blaise created a Twitter campaign with Ani Kayode Somtochukwu and Victor Emmanuel. The three successfully made the hashtag "#EndHomophobiainNigeria" trend on Nigerian Twitter for multiple days.

Having been detained and threatened by Special Anti-Robbery Squad officers for "perceived homosexuality", Blaise became active in the October 2020 End SARS protests, where they were verbally assaulted for carrying a sign with the words "Queer Lives Matter". They additionally organized a group of other queer people to attend the protests.

After the 2020 Lekki shooting, Blaise started working with Safe HQuse to support queer protestors and survivors.

Personal life 
Blaise is non-binary, and uses they/them pronouns.  they were attending Alex Ekwueme Federal University Ndufu Alike Ikwo in Nigeria, seeking a Bachelor of Arts in English and Literary Studies.

Blaise became more outspoken about their sexuality on social media after they were punched and choked by a priest for being gay in 2019, and other people in the church did not intervene.

Recognition 
Blaise was a Women Deliver youth leader in 2020; they were 22 years old at the time. Also in 2020, they were a winner of The Future Awards Africa "Prize for Leading Conversations", and The Initiative for Equal Rights' award for "SOGIESC Rights Activist of the Year".

In June 2021, they were featured in a short film by Dafe Oboro that accompanied the summer 2021 cover story of Dazed. In November 2021, they were honoured with a "Generation Change Award" at the 2021 MTV Europe Music Awards in Budapest.

Notes

References 

1990s births
Date of birth missing (living people)
Year of birth missing (living people)
Igbo people
Nigerian activists
End SARS activists
Nigerian non-binary people
Non-binary activists
Nigerian LGBT rights activists
Living people